Alleva Dairy, established in 1892 and located on Grand Street, in the Little Italy neighborhood of Manhattan, was at the time of it's closure on March 1, 2023 the oldest cheese shop in the United States.

The business was founded by Pino Alleva from Benevento, Italy.  In 2014 the business was bought by the actor and onetime boxing manager John Ciarcia (aka Cha Cha and dubbed the unofficial mayor of Little Italy), a cousin of the Alleva family, and his wife Karen King. At one point Tony Danza, the actor, entertainer, and former boxer whom Cha Cha had once managed as a pugilist, was a partner in the shop.

In April 2022, it was reported that the store and its owner Karen King was more than $500,000 behind in rent because of the effects of the COVID-19 pandemic, leading to widespread coverage of the financial dilemma of the business and possible forthcoming closure.

On February 8, 2023, it was announced that the business would close the following month because of a disagreement with its landlord regarding unpaid rent. In September 2021, the store had applied for Chapter 11 bankruptcy, and its lease ended in October. The landlord agreed to forego the overdue rent if the store paid a one-time sum of $31,000 and cleared out of the property by March 5, 2023.  This brought to an end an occupancy which lasted for mote than 130 years.

At the time of the closure of it's original  Manhattan space, owner Karen King announced that Alleva Dairy will open at a new location on Polito Avenue in Lyndhurst, New Jersey.

References

Cheesemakers
Companies based in Manhattan
1892 in New York City
Dairy products
Companies that filed for Chapter 11 bankruptcy in 2022
Retail companies disestablished in 2023
2023 disestablishments in New York (state)